Rovdino is a rural locality (a village) in Nizhneyerogodskoye Rural Settlement, Velikoustyugsky District, Vologda Oblast, Russia. The population was 7 as of 2002.

Geography 
Rovdino is located 35 km southwest of Veliky Ustyug (the district's administrative centre) by road. Zapan is the nearest rural locality.

References 

Rural localities in Velikoustyugsky District